EFET may refer to:
 Enontekiö Airport's ICAO code
 European Federation of Energy Traders, a European industry association of wholesale energy traders